The 2009–10 Nemzeti Bajnokság I, also known as NB I, was the 108th season of top-tier football in Hungary. The league was officially named Soproni Liga for sponsorship reasons. The season began on 24 July 2009 and ended on 23 May 2010. Debrecen were the defending champions, and they defended their title.

Promotion and relegation from 2008–09
BFC Siófok and Rákospalotai EAC finished the season in the last two places and thus were relegated to their respective NB II divisions. Siófok ended a two-year stint in Hungary's highest football league while Rákospalota were relegated after four years.

Promotion to the league was achieved by the champions of the NB II Eastern Division, Ferencvárosi TC and by the runners-up of the Western Division, Lombard-Pápa TFC. Both teams return to the National Division after three-year absences. Lombard-Pápa capitalized on the denial of a NB I license for Western Division champions Gyirmót SE.

Overview

Stadia and locations

Personnel and sponsoring

Managerial changes

League table

Results

Top goalscorers
Including matches played on 18 May 2010; Source: MLSZ (Click on "Góllövő lista")

References

External links
 Official site 

Nemzeti Bajnokság I seasons
1
Hungary